Diane MacDonald Barz (August 18, 1943 – May 14, 2014) was an American judge. She was the first woman to serve as a member of the Montana Supreme Court, a position she held from September 1989 to 1990. She also served as an assistant United States attorney from 1991 to 1994. Her career covered many firsts for women in Montana legal history, and she also ran the Montana Youth Court for over fifteen years, where she founded the Youth Court Conference Committee.

Career 
Barz received her J.D. degree from University of Montana Law School in 1968. In her law school graduating class, she had been the only female graduate, and she would be the first woman to serve as a law clerk in the Montana Supreme Court, the first to found a female law firm (with partner Doris Popler), and in 1978 the first woman elected as a Montana District Court judge, where she also became the youngest person elected. She also served as public defender for Yellowstone County, Montana. In 1987, she sentenced convicted murderer David Thomas Dawson to death. Dawson was subsequently executed in 2006 and remains the last person executed by the state of Montana. In 1989, Governor Stan Stephens appointed Barz as an associate justice of the Montana Supreme Court, where she was the first woman to serve on the court. In 1990, Barz resigned from the court since it was too far away from her family. She then served as assistant United States attorney and then again served as Montana District Court judge, serving for 22 years. On the Montana District Court, Barz spent over 15 years running the Youth Court, where she founded the Youth Court Conference Committee to limit the terms of youth incarceration.

In 2003, Barz retired from the District Court in 2003 but continued to work elsewhere. She conducted two investigations for the University of Montana: a 2004 investigation of the athletic department that found a million dollar shortfall was due to negligence and a 2011 sexual assault investigation that found multiple sexual assault reports and led to a conviction. She described the university as having “a problem of sexual assault on and off campus”. She also served as a temporary judge in several western Montana courts. She was described by the president of the State Bar of Montana as a "smart and competent judge who could be tough."

Personal life 
Born in Bozeman, Montana to Bernice (Johnson) MacDonald and World War II pilot John MacDonald, Barz graduated from high school in Concord, California and then received her bachelor's degree from Whitworth University. She also studied at Heidelberg University in Germany for a year. In 1969, she met her husband, Dan Barz, and married him a year later; they and their dogs hunted birds annually, and she also participated in antelope hunts, fishing, boating, and foraging. Her family provided scholarships to the University of Montana and Montana State University. Barz died in Billings, Montana of cancer, which she had first been diagnosed with eight years earlier.

See also
List of female state supreme court justices
List of first women lawyers and judges in Montana

Notes

1943 births
2014 deaths
Justices of the Montana Supreme Court
Montana state court judges
Whitworth University alumni
University of Montana alumni
Deaths from cancer in Montana
Politicians from Bozeman, Montana
20th-century American judges
20th-century American women judges
21st-century American women
Assistant United States Attorneys